The White armored car was a series of armored cars developed by the White Motor Company in Cleveland, Ohio from 1915.

Models
 White No.1 4x2 armored car built in 1915 from US chassis fitted with armoured hull by Laffly. Used by the French Army during WW-1.
 White No.2 4x2 armored car built in 1916 and used by the United States Army and United States Marines
 White Model 1917 4x2 armored car built in 1917 developed into the AEF
 White AEF (also known as White Model 1918) 4x2 armored car built in 1918 and used by the American Expeditionary Force, French Army until 1933 and in the French colonies until 1941 - part of them were modernized and fitted with French Laffly chassis, known as White-Laffly.

The White Motor Company continued after the First World War to develop armored cars including the M1 Scout Car, M3 Scout Car, M2 Half Track Car, M3 Half-track, M13 Multiple Gun Motor Carriage, and M16 Multiple Gun Motor Carriage.

See also
 G-numbers

References and external links
 White No.2 War Wheels
 White Model 1917 with images and spec sheet
 White AEF
White AM (Model 1915/1918) Armored Car
 White AEF

Armoured cars of the United States
World War I armoured cars
Military vehicles introduced in the 1910s